Matúš Putnocký (born 1 November 1984) is a Slovak professional footballer who plays as a goalkeeper for Polish club Sandecja Nowy Sącz. Besides Slovakia, he has played in Poland.

Club career
In May 2016 he signed a three-year contract with Lech Poznań.

International career
In September 2011, Putnocký received his first senior call-up for an UEFA Euro 2012 qualification game against Armenia on 8 September.

Career statistics

Club

1 Including Polish SuperCup.

Honours

Club

MFK Košice
 Slovak Cup: 2008–09

ŠK Slovan Bratislava
 Slovak Super Liga: 2010–11, 2012–13, 2013–14
 Slovak Cup: 2009–10, 2010–11, 2012–13

Lech Poznań
 Polish SuperCup: 2016

References

External links
 
 Slovan Bratislava profile
 MFK Košice profile
 

1984 births
Living people
Sportspeople from Prešov
Slovak footballers
Slovak expatriate footballers
Association football goalkeepers
Partizán Bardejov players
FC Steel Trans Ličartovce players
Slovak Super Liga players
FC VSS Košice players
ŠK Slovan Bratislava players
FC Nitra players
Ruch Chorzów players
Lech Poznań players
Śląsk Wrocław players
Sandecja Nowy Sącz players
Ekstraklasa players
I liga players
Expatriate footballers in Poland
Slovak expatriate sportspeople in Poland